Robson Lake is an unofficially named glacier-lake located at the toe of the Robson Glacier.  The lake is the source of the Robson River.  The Robson exits at the lake's north end while the Robson Glacier feeds the lake at its south end.  The Robson, after exiting the lake, soon splits into many braids before entering Berg Lake.

See also 
Kinney Lake

Lakes of British Columbia
Robson Valley
Canadian Rockies